Åsbygda is a small village in Ringerike municipality of Buskerud,  Norway.

Åsbygda can be said to include the areas  along the Randselva river, down towards the village of  Viul  and north to the county border at Jevnaker on the Randsfjorden in Oppland. This area experienced hard treatment during World War II, with several fierce battles conducted here.
Åsbygda school was shut down at the end in June 2007.

References

Villages in Buskerud